Laaga Chunari Mein Daag – Journey Of A Woman is a 2007 Indian Hindi-language drama film directed by Pradeep Sarkar and starring Jaya Bachchan, Rani Mukherji, Konkona Sen Sharma, Anupam Kher, Kunal Kapoor and Abhishek Bachchan. Produced by Aditya Chopra, it premiered on 12 October 2007. The film was the first directed by Sarkar under the Yash Raj Films banner.

Plot

Vibhavari "Badki" Sahay and Shubhavari "Chutki" Sahay, are the daughters of Shivshankar Sahay and Savitri Sahay. They live on the banks of the Ganges in Banaras. Life is full of happiness and joy for the two sisters although the family is poor and their house badly needs repairs. Savitri struggles to financially support the family by sewing clothes, and Badki left school before completing 12th standard in order to help Savitri earn more. Both Savitri and Badki are determined to ensure that Chutki completes her education, while Shivshankar spends his days buying lottery tickets and voicing his resentment that Badki was not born a son.

When Shivshankar falls ill and greedy relatives threaten to sue the family for their house, Badki goes to Mumbai to find work, but she is continuously rejected due to her lack of education and qualifications. She begs her friend Karan to introduce her to his sleazy middle-aged boss, Gupta. Married yet lonely, he offers her a lucrative job on the condition that she physically please him, with sex. She returns to her residence to find out the land lady has evicted her without notice. Homeless and lonely, a desperate Badki contacts Gupta and meets him in a posh hotel room, where they have sex. She feels she has secured her job, only for Gupta to reveal that he had manipulated her for sex; he refuses her the job and throws money at her, offering her a job as his personal escort, leaving her anguished. Feeling defeated and out of options, Badki becomes an escort, taking only wealthy men as clients. Coached by Karan's friend Michelle, Badki learns how to speak English and how to dress modernly and goes by the name "Natasha." Badki lies to her father and Chutki that she found work as an event planner and sends money for Shivshankar's medicines, house repairs, and a family lawyer. Although Savitri knows the truth and is pained by it, she does not dissuade Badki for fear of losing the steady flow of money. Through one of her clients, Badki meets and falls in love with attorney Rohan in Zurich but then leaves him fearing that he would be disgusted by her profession.

Meanwhile, Chutki completes her MBA and comes to live with Badki in Mumbai. She starts working at an agency and begins a relationship with her boss, creative director Vivaan, who soon proposes to her. While wedding preparations begin in Banaras, Savitri calls Chutki to implore her that Badki not attend the celebrations, for fear of Badki's profession being discovered and bringing shame on the family. Chutki then inadvertently discovers Badki's secret, and while initially upset, she apologizes to Badki for their family's selfishness. Chutki fiercely vows to remain by Badki's side and begs Badki to attend her wedding.

At Chutki's wedding in Banaras, Badki comes face-to-face with Rohan, who is revealed to be Vivaan's older brother. Old feelings resurface between the two, and Rohan asks Badki to marry him. Badki refuses, feeling that Rohan would never accept her if he knew the truth, and informs her mother of his proposal. Savitri is terrified of the possibility of Chutki's wedding being ruined and blames Badki for coming to Banaras. Chutki, however, rebukes her mother for overlooking Badki's sacrifices for the family and urges Badki to finally put herself first, whatever consequences there might be for Chutki's marriage. Shivshankar overhears this conversation and, along with Savitri, realizes what Badki has suffered for the family's sake. Badki divulges her profession to Rohan, who shocks her by revealing that he knew from the moment they were introduced by her client in Zurich. He explains that he deeply admires her character and the sacrifices she made for her family and wants to marry her. Badki accepts, and the two couples marry in a joint wedding ceremony.

Cast

 Jaya Bachchan as Savitri Sahay
 Rani Mukherji as Vibhavari "Vibha/Vibs/Badki" Sahay / Natasha
 Konkona Sen Sharma as Shubhavari "Shubhi/Chutki" Sahay 
 Anupam Kher as Shivshankar Sahay
 Kunal Kapoor as Vivaan Verma
Abhishek Bachchan as Rohan Verma
 Kamini Kaushal as Rohan and Vivaan's grandmother
 Tarana Raja as Sophia
 Ninad Kamat as Karan
 Harsh Chhaya as K. K. Gupta
 Murli Sharma as Sunil Bhatia
 Tinnu Anand as Rajshankar 'Rajjo' Sahay
 Sushant Singh as Ratan Sahay
 Suchitra Pillai as Michele
 Sanjay Taneja as BDO
 Kalki Koechlin
 Shriya Sharma
 Hema Malini in a cameo appearance as Dulari Bai

Production
Saif Ali Khan was initially approached for the role of Rohan that went to Abhishek Bachchan, and Vidya Balan had earlier been offered the role that went to Konkona Sen Sharma.

Laaga Chunari Mein Daag was Jaya Bachchan's first film since Nikhil Advani's Kal Ho Naa Ho (2003).

The production of the film gathered some controversy when a lighting crew-member drowned in the Ganges River. During a shooting session in Varanasi, Mukerji's bodyguards aggressively moved media people and fans away from the film set. A political and media storm followed, as various groups insisted that Mukerji should have stopped the security guards. The actress then apologized to the media, though claiming the media were trying to get too close to both her and Sen Sharma. Some scenes involving Mukerji and Bachchan were shot in Bern, Switzerland and Lucerne, Switzerland.

Music

The film's soundtrack was released on 10 September 2007. Songs such as "Hum To Aise Hain" and "Kachchi Kaliyaan" featured playback singers such as Sunidhi Chauhan, Shreya Ghoshal and KK. The soundtrack received a 3 out of 5 rating on indiaFm.com.

Release and reception
Laaga Chunari Mein Daag premiered on 12 October 2007 in Mumbai and was released on the same day in North America.

Box office
In an interview with the filmmaker Pradeep Sarkar, said: "It was a tight budget film made with 150 million and already on the first week it has made 250 million gross worldwide. In what way we are saying that it is not doing well?" asked Sarkar. "Admitting that the film did take a slow start in the domestic market, he's hopeful it will grow on audiences in the weeks ahead, much in the same way that his debut film Parineeta (2005) did. "

The film earned ₹17.5 crore in India and ₹3.17 crore in other territories, for a worldwide total of ₹ 20.67 crore.

Critical response
In India, the film received a generally negative critical response, with reviewers criticizing the repetitious and obsolete story line. Raja Sen of Rediff.com said the movie "takes us back to a kind of cinema we thought we were done with. Indian cinema threw off the dupatta just a little while ago; let's not shackle it back down". Taran Adarsh from indiaFM said it "stands on a shaky script and has all chances of slipping". Martin D'Souza of Glamsham.com noted, "this is a big letdown" from the director of the well-received Parineeta (2005). Hindustan Times wrote that, "This one comes out smelling of mothballs, like a wedding dress stored for decades in an attic trunk. Not surprising, since the plot is vintage 1977 from Aaina, and the award-winning Marathi film Doghi (1995)" (made by Sumitra Bhave with Uttara Baokar, Sadashiv Amrapurkar, Sonali Kulkarni and Renuka Daftardar).

Critical response in the United States was more mixed.  Frank Lovece of Film Journal International said that the film put "glossy Bollywood confection" in a historical context, calling it a "good old-fashioned, Douglas Sirk-style women's weepie ... so universal you could substitute Joan Crawford for Rani Mukherji and New York City for Mumbai". Maitland McDonagh of TV Guide found the film "breaks no new ground but is solidly entertaining" while David Chute of L.A. Weekly said, "The movie works so hard to transform its shocking subject into acceptable material for middlebrow melodrama that it never deals with it". Rachel Saltz of the New York Times termed the film, "A fascinating blend of musical, melodrama and feminist fairy tale".

Awards
53rd Filmfare Awards:

Nominated
 Best Actress – Rani Mukherji
 Best Supporting Actress – Konkona Sen Sharma
9th IIFA Awards:

Nominated
 Best Actress – Rani Mukherji
 Best Supporting Actress – Konkona Sen Sharma
5th Stardust Awards:

Nominated
 Star of the Year – Female – Rani Mukherji

References

External links
 
 

2007 films
2000s Hindi-language films
Films set in Uttar Pradesh
Films about prostitution in India
Films shot in Uttar Pradesh
Hindi remakes of Kannada films
Films about women in India
Yash Raj Films films
Films directed by Pradeep Sarkar